'Maine' is a selection of the American Elm Ulmus americana made by the USNA for use in disease-resistance trials. It has not been formally registered as a cultivar.

Description
Not available.

Pests and diseases
'Maine' proved particularly susceptible to Dutch elm disease exhibiting 30% crown dieback in one year after inoculation with the disease's causal fungus.

Cultivation
The tree it is not known to have been cultivated beyond the United States.

Accessions

North America

None known.

References

American elm cultivar
Ulmus articles missing images
Ulmus